Charles Olmeus (born February 16, 1947) is a Haitian former track and field athlete who competed at the 1976 Olympic Games in Montreal.

Charles competed at 10000 metres, and completed his qualifying heat in 42:00.11. He finished 14 minutes behind the heat winner Carlos Lopes of Portugal and 8.5 minutes behind Chris McCubbins of Canada who finished next to last. While he completed the last six laps alone on the  track, officials argued whether he should be allowed to finish the course. Ultimately he was, which held up the entire track and field schedule by fourteen minutes.

Charles was one of the members of the notorious squad of Haitian long distance track and field athletes delegated to the Olympic Games by the Baby Doc Duvalier regime during the 1970s and 1980s, who gained fame by setting all-time worst times on the Olympics, many of which are still standing today. Other notable performers included Anilus Joseph who started his 1972 10000 metres qualifying heat in a sprint then dropped out when he was already a mile behind the leaders, Wilnor Joseph who covered the 800 metres with a time of 2:15.26 in 1976, and Dieudonne Lamothe who finished last at both the 5000 metres in 1976 and at the marathon race in 1984.

See also
Olympian marathoners made famous by finishing last:
 John Stephen Akhwari
 Luvsanlkhündegiin Otgonbayar
 Pyambuugiin Tuul
 Abdul Baser Wasiqi

References

External links
 Olmeus Charles Biography and Statistics

1947 births
Living people
Haitian male long-distance runners
Olympic athletes of Haiti
Athletes (track and field) at the 1975 Pan American Games
Athletes (track and field) at the 1976 Summer Olympics
Pan American Games competitors for Haiti